Shitan Township / Shihtan Township is a rural township in Miaoli County, Taiwan. It is located in a mountainous area with a mild, sub-tropical climate.  Its rainy season is from May to September. Shitan's population was estimated to be 4,141 in January 2023.

History
The area was occupied by native Taiwanese through the 19th Century with an economy strongly dependent upon hunting. In 1876 under Qing rule, the Chinese began to build bullock roads into the area. However it was not until the 1930s, during Japanese rule, that standardized roads began to be constructed. The first motor vehicle road was completed into Shitan in 1939, and regular bus service was started.  However, by 1942 the bus service had ended because of fuel rationing.

Administrative divisions
The township comprises seven villages: Boshou, Fenglin, Hexing, Xindian, Xinfeng, Yongxing and Zhumu.

Politics
The township is part of Miaoli County Constituency II electoral district for Legislative Yuan.

Culture

The Shitan Village Historic Museum preserves a Hakka dwelling from the Koxinga period.
Other landmarks include Lingdong Temple, Shitan Presbyterian Church and Wenshui Old Street.

Local food specialities include Tea and Mesona chinensis (仙草), which is served as a hot, viscous drink, or curded and served over ice as a type of grass jelly.

Education
Among the schools in Shitan are:
苗栗縣立獅潭國中
苗栗縣獅潭鄉獅潭國民小學 Shitan Elementary School in Chinese
苗栗縣獅潭鄉永興國民小學
苗栗縣獅潭鄉豐林國民小學

Transportation
Shitan is served by provincial highways No. 3 and No. 72.

Notable natives
 Yiong Con-ziin, Minister of the Hakka Affairs Council

References

External links

 

Townships in Miaoli County